Henri Pierre (May 20, 1918 – February 17, 1994) was a French journalist, who co-founded newspaper Le Monde in 1944. He continued as a reporter for the paper until his retirement in 1982.

Biography

Personal life
Henri Pierre was born on May 20, 1918 in Lyon. He studied at the Saumer Cavalry School, before starting his career as a journalist.

He was married to Brigitte, who died in 1991. They had 3 children, Dominique, Francois and Oliver.

Journalistic career
During his time as a journalist for Le Monde, Pierre served as the paper's correspondent in Moscow, London and Washington, D.C.

References

Bibliography
"Obituary: Henri Pierre, Journalist, 75", New York Times (14-02-94)

1918 births
1994 deaths
French male non-fiction writers
20th-century French male writers